Motordrome is the third album by Danish singer and songwriter MØ, released on 28 January 2022 through Columbia Records. It was announced alongside the release of the singles "Brad Pitt" and "Goosebumps" on 12 November 2021, and also includes the singles "Live to Survive" and "Kindness". MØ was to tour Europe and North America from February 2022 in support of the album.

Motordrome charted only in Denmark, debuting at number nine on the Danish Albums Chart.

Background
MØ began work on Motordrome to help herself "out of a downward spiral – out of the motor d[r]ome of her own head". She characterised the album as being "about both the sadness and the joy of making changes in your life" and stated that she hopes Motordrome feels "genuine" to listeners in the sense that "there are stories there that they can connect with". She also expressed that the album "represents a huge change in my life. Even though I'm still doing what I love doing, it does feel like a new chapter. That is scary, but it's freeing."

Singles
"Live to Survive" was issued as the first single on 28 May 2021, followed two months later by second single "Kindness" on 30 July. The official album announcement on 12 November 2021 was accompanied by the third and fourth singles "Brad Pitt" and "Goosebumps".

Critical reception

Motordrome has received generally favourable reviews from music critics. At Metacritic, which assigns a normalised rating out of 100 to reviews from mainstream critics, the album has an average score of 68 based on ten reviews. Writing for Slant Magazine, Charles Lyons-Burt gave the album rating 2.5 out of 5 stars and wrote, "When Ørsted ramps up the bombast, Motordrome reaches a serviceable level of pop pageantry. But most of the singer's cooed melodies feel comparatively half-hearted. Ultimately, the album has a way of getting your attention and failing to keep it." In a positive review Gigwises Adam England stated that "MØ sound might have evolved to incorporate both her previous material and her teenage tastes, but this could be her best album yet. It's algorithm, baby." El Hunt from NME stated "The record doesn't always hit the mark" and add that "The immensely memorable hooks on show certainly help, too – but after 'Motordrome's fizzled out, you're left wishing the engines revved a little louder." The Independents Helen Brown opined that "Tracks have enough energy to keep limbs twitching, but not enough force to pull bystanders from the walls." Writing for Clash, Robin Murray felt that "Motordrome utilises its 10 track span to broach a number of fresh ideas; spinning the dial once more, MØ is able to conjure something fresh, taking risks that few peers would attempt". Writing for The Line of Best Fit, John Amen lauded the album, concluding that "Motordrome is a multifaceted delight and an early contender for pop album of the year."

Tour 
MØ made the first announcement of her Motordrome World Tour Chapter One tour dates on November 12, 2021, and ticket sales were available from November 17, 2021. The tour covered Europe and North America. However, on December 17 on social media, the singer wrote that concert dates in Europe had been postponed from February to May due to coronavirus restrictions. In March, the singer performed with Imagine Dragons as a support act on their North American tour Mercury World Tour. The tour began on February 26, 2022 in Chicago.

Track listing

Notes
  signifies a miscellaneous producer
 "Spaceman" interpolates a Babylon Zoo's 1995 track Spaceman from their debut album The Boy with the X-Ray Eyes.

Personnel
Musicians
 MØ – vocals
 Jake Braun – cello (1)
 SG Lewis – bass, drums, guitar, keyboards, programming, synthesizer (2)
 Rasmus Littauer – programming (5), drums (10)
 Andreas Lund – guitar (6)
 Josefine Struckmann Pedersen – background vocals (7)
 Melissa Gregerson – background vocals (7)
 Ronni Vindahl – guitar (7)
 August Rosenbaum – piano (8)
 Yangze – piano (8)
 Live Johansson – cello (10)
 Karen Johanne Pedersen – violin (10)

Technical
 Emily Lazar – mastering
 Chris Allgood – mastering (1, 3–10)
 Geoff Swan – mixing (1, 3–10)
 Serban Ghenea – mixing (2)
 Jasmine Chen – engineering (1, 4)
 Matt DiMona – engineering (1, 4)
 John Hanes – engineering (2)
 Anthony Dolhai – engineering (7)
 Karen Marie Ørsted – vocal production (1, 3–5, 9)
 Ariel Rechtshaid – vocal production (1, 4)
 SG Lewis – vocal production (2)
 Sly – vocal production (2)
 Caroline Ailin – vocal production (2)
 Ronni Vindahl – vocal production (3, 9)

Charts

Release history

References

2022 albums
Albums produced by Ariel Rechtshaid
Albums produced by Linus Wiklund
Albums produced by SG Lewis
Columbia Records albums
MØ albums